Roger Francis Wolff (April 10, 1911 – March 23, 1994) was an American professional baseball player.

Baseball career
Wolff's professional career began in 1930 and he spent 12 full seasons in the minor leagues before getting his first major-league opportunity at the end of the 1941 season, starting two games for Connie Mack's Philadelphia Athletics. He was charged with the loss in each contest, but threw two complete games and compiled a decent 3.18 earned run average. The remainder of his pro career would be spent as a major leaguer, initially during the manpower shortage caused by World War II. He lost a combined 45 games during the three seasons of  through  (winning 26), but in —the last wartime season—he would experience a dramatic turnaround in performance.

Stellar 1945 campaign
As a member of Washington's four-knuckleball-pitcher starting rotation (along with Mickey Haefner, Dutch Leonard and Johnny Niggeling), Wolff helped lead the Senators to a second-place finish, only 1 games behind the eventual world champion Detroit Tigers. He posted a 20–10 won–lost record and a 2.12 earned run average, and placed in the American League's Top 10 in multiple statistical categories:

Most Valuable Player (seventh)
Wins Above Replacement (sixth, with 5.6; third in WAR for pitchers, with 6.0)
Games Won (third, with 20)
Winning Percentage (sixth, with .667)
Walks Plus Hits Per Inning Pitched (first, with 1.012)
Earned Run Average (third, with 2.12)
Strikeouts (tied for fifth, with 108)
Complete Games (tied for third, with 21)
Shutouts (tied for fourth, with four)
Innings Pitched (sixth, with 250)

Wolff threw a one-hit shutout on June 19 against Philadelphia at Griffith Stadium, allowing only a fourth-inning double to Hal Peck. No All-Star Game was played in 1945 due to travel restrictions caused by the war. He was traded to Cleveland in March of 1947, and worked in 20 games for the Indians and Pirates before leaving pro baseball.

Wolff's career won–lost record was 52–69 with an earned run average of 3.41. In 182 games, including 128 starts, he compiled 63 complete games, eight shutouts and 12 saves, allowing 1,018 hits and 316 bases on balls, with 430 strikeouts, in 1,025 innings pitched.

After baseball, he worked in private business and was the longtime athletic director at the Southern Illinois Penitentiary. He died at age 82 in Chester, Illinois.

See also

1945 Washington Senators season
List of knuckleball pitchers

References

External links

Vitty, Cort, Roger Wolff, Society for American Baseball Research Biography Project

1911 births
1994 deaths
Baseball players from Illinois
Cedar Rapids Raiders players
Cleveland Indians players
Dallas Steers players
Danville Veterans players
Dayton Ducks players
Denver Bears players
Fort Worth Cats players
Indianapolis Indians players
Keokuk Indians players
Knuckleball pitchers
Major League Baseball pitchers
Oklahoma City Indians players
People from Randolph County, Illinois
Philadelphia Athletics players
Pittsburgh Pirates players
Springfield Senators players
Terre Haute Tots players
Washington Senators (1901–1960) players
Williamsport Grays players